Dianella is a suburb of Perth, Western Australia. It is within the local government area of the City of Stirling.

Dianella was named after the botanical title of a small blue lily, Dianella revoluta, a narrow-leafed plant that was plentiful in the area prior to residential development.

History 
Early development of the area was slow, as the sandy soil, part of the Banksia sandplain, was considered unsuitable for agriculture. Dianella comprised localities known as North Inglewood, East Yokine, Morley Park and Bedford Park. They were amalgamated into Dianella in 1958, which generated some growth.

Development progressed during the 1960s and housing construction first occurred north from Walter Road and Grand Promenade, with St Andrews, Montclair Rise and Dress Circle Estates being the last major areas to be developed in the early 2000s. The character of housing ranges from modest post-war homes to large, modern two storey dwellings.

Dianella was Perth and Western Australia's media centre; with three of Perth's major commercial television stations based there until Channel 7 relocated to Osborne Park in 2015. Channel 9 and Channel 10 left the suburb in 2016 and are now in St Georges Terrace and Subiaco, respectively.

Recreation facilities 

There are a number of small parks in Dianella and a large regional open space. Vicinity Centres Dianella is the major shopping centre in the suburb, with several smaller local stores.  Education is provided by a number of primary schools as well as high schools in Mirrabooka and Morley.

Dianella Regional Open Space is at the junction of Alexander Drive and Morley Drive and provides a landscape feature for the suburb as well as sporting facilities. The area is home to a number of sporting codes, including lacrosse, football, little athletics, soccer and cricket as well as many more indoor sports..

Demography 

Dianella lies at the heart of Perth's small Jewish community. Although this is the third largest Jewish community in Australia, numbers have never reached more than 6000 members (the most recent Australian census put Western Australia's entire Jewish community at 5,300 members). Dianella itself is home to a number of community institutions such as a Jewish day school (Carmel), a sports club, an aged home (Maurice Zeffert Home) and a small synagogue known as "Dianella Shul". A number of streets in the region are named after Jewish icons such as Menora, Maccabean and Golda Meir. Despite a small but steady stream of Jewish immigration from South Africa and China, specifically Kaifeng, the community in Dianella and surrounding suburbs is shrinking as many young people leave Perth, mainly heading to the larger Australian Jewish communities in Melbourne and Sydney.

Dianella is also part of Perth's small Greek community, the second biggest hub for the Greek Orthodox Community in Perth, the biggest being in the centre of Northbridge. During the early 1990s, the Greek community of Perth wanted a Greek Orthodox College so that children of Greek origin could learn the Greek language and to be engaged in the Greek culture while going to school. Today, there is a Greek day school (St Andrew's Grammar) which is located in the St Andrews Land Estate and a small Greek Orthodox Church (Agios Nectarios) located in the northern sector of the suburb just next to the Dress Circle Land Estate. Next to the Greek Orthodox College there is a Greek retirement home (Hellenic Community Aged Care). Some streets in the northern sector of the suburb have names of Greek origin such as Hellenic Drive in the St Andrews Land Estate.

References 

Suburbs of Perth, Western Australia